Ahuachapán is a department of El Salvador in the west of the country. The capital is Ahuachapán. In the South it has the Apaneca-Ilamatepec Range and the Cerro Grande de Apaneca (Apaneca Grand Hill).

Municipalities 
 Ahuachapán
 Apaneca
 Atiquizaya
 Concepción de Ataco
 El Refugio
 Guaymango
 Jujutla
 San Francisco Menéndez
 San Lorenzo
 San Pedro Puxtla
 Tacuba
 Turín

 
Departments of El Salvador
States and territories established in 1869
1869 establishments in El Salvador